Bogue Faliah is a stream in the U.S. state of Mississippi.

Bogue Faliah is a name derived from the Choctaw language meaning "long creek". Variant names are "Boga Falia", "Bogue Falia", "Bogue Faliah Creek", "Bogue Filia", "Bogue Filiah", and "Bogue Litto".

References

Rivers of Mississippi
Rivers of Newton County, Mississippi
Rivers of Scott County, Mississippi
Mississippi placenames of Native American origin